Athena is a 2022 French epic action drama film directed by Romain Gavras, from a screenplay by Gavras, Ladj Ly and Elias Belkeddar. The film stars Dali Benssalah, Sami Slimane, Anthony Bajon, Ouassini Embarek and Alexis Manenti.

Athena had its world premiere at the 79th Venice International Film Festival on 9 September 2022, where it competed for the Golden Lion award, and was released on 23 September 2022 by Netflix. The film received polarizing reviews, with praise for the direction, score and technical aspects but criticized its lack of depth in the screenplay and weak story.

Plot 
Abdel, an Algerian-French soldier, holds a press conference outside a police station after his 13-year-old brother Idir dies in hospital, the result of three apparent policemen beating and leaving him for dead. He appeals for calm, but a group of youth, led by Abdel’s brother Karim, disrupt the press conference by tossing a Molotov cocktail and raiding the police station. After stealing a weapons locker and a police van, the youth head back to their banlieue Athena, where Abdel also grew up. They begin to barricade themselves - and the residents of Athena - inside the housing complex.

CRS riot police are sent to put down the uprising, while the youth respond by shooting fireworks and other improvised missiles at the police. In the middle of the chaos, a drug dealer named Moktar tries to move bags of contraband out of Athena. With the youth refusing to let him leave, Moktar and his gang take shelter in Athena’s shisha lounge, where they dig a hole to stash the contraband until the uprising has passed.

Abdel returns to Athena to attend a memorial service for Idir. He sees Karim and tries to speak to him, but the latter escapes where the memorial service is disrupted by the ongoing violence outside. Abdel then helps to organize an evacuation and shelter for Athena’s residents, including a former terrorist named Sebastien, whom Abdel shelters in Athena’s daycare center. While leading a group of residents past a group of riot police, an altercation begins, and Abdel and other residents of Athena are kettled and arrested.

Night falls and the riot police move in on the housing complex. Their units are forced to retreat, and in the ensuing chaos a young officer named Jerôme is separated from his unit and captured by the youth. The youth send a video of Jerôme to the police, threatening to kill him unless the three policemen who beat Idir are identified. Abdel is released from custody by the on-site police commander and sneaks in to Athena, where he confronts Karim about the violent uprising he has incited. He attempts to leave with Jerôme, but the youth pursue them, and the two are forced to take shelter in the shisha lounge.

Moktar greets Abdel, and it is revealed that the two are half-brothers. He calls policemen who are on his payroll, and they agree to come rescue Jerôme. Karim, intent on recapturing Jerôme, confronts Abdel through the security shutter covering the front of the shisha lounge, while others try to break in through a side door. The standoff is ended when the corrupt policemen arrive, but Karim attacks them and is shot dead.

Enraged by his brother’s death, Abdel savagely beats Moktar and captures Jerôme for himself. He calls the police commander and reiterates the rioters’ demands for the policemen’s names, then instructs Sebastien to aid the youth. The police commander calls once more, insisting that the policemen on the video were not actual police, and warns Abdel that the police tactical unit is being sent in. On a video call with the commander, Abdel points his gun at Jerôme and fires twice, but it is revealed that he intentionally missed. Overcome by emotion, Abdel makes no attempt to stop Jerôme from leaving the building. With the tactical team closing in, the building level is blown up by makeshift bombs created by Sebastien, killing Abdel.

In the final scene of the movie, a man in a van is shown recording the beating of Idir, which is later posted on social media. The “policemen” are revealed to be far-right instigators in disguise; they enter the van, drive into the woods, and burn the uniforms they had worn, revealing that the beating was a deliberate attempt to incite racial unrest.

Cast

Production 
The film was produced by Iconoclast and Lyly Films. It features dialogue in French and Arabic.

Release 
The film had its world premiere at the 79th Venice International Film Festival. Distributed by Netflix, it was released in select cinemas on 9 September 2022, followed by a streaming release on 23 September 2022.

Reception

Critical response 
 

David Rooney of The Hollywood Reporter summed up the film as "nerve-rattling, intense and explosive", deeming it to be "a live grenade, beginning in full ignition mode and dialing up its intensity throughout with virtuoso technique".

Todd McCarthy of Deadline Hollywood described the film as "a torrent, an inundation, a cascade of rage, fury and frustration over the realities of life for a particular group of French families" that "grabs you by the throat and barely allows you a moment for a gasp of air".

David Ehrlich of IndieWire rated the film 'C+', considering that it is "just a really cool movie about a country that's ready to catch fire", that "would have been more harrowing and successful had it fully owned the courage of [the anger of the dispossessed]".

Tim Grierson of Screen Daily considered that Athena "works better as a brash, immersive action spectacle than a thought-provoking political thriller".

Peter Bradshaw of The Guardian rated the film 3 out of 5 stars, deeming it to be a film highlighted by "a sensational opening", yet also losing "its dramatic shape" afterwards.

Lucile Commeaux of France Culture considers this film to be "dishonest and bad, in every sense of the word", a "big clip released on a platform that aestheticizes the aftermath of an alleged police blunder", with a "hyper-artificial structure [that] hardly maintains interest".

Sandra Onana of Libération, who denounces a "deluge of stylized violence" and "non-existent characters", judges that "Romain Gavras stuns the spectator with a political casualness that forces disrespect".

In Le Point, Jean-Luc Wachthausen wonders "Is it still fiction when such a crude daily reality, which has become familiar to millions of French people, is rendered?".

Political reactions 
French right-wing politicians, such as Gilbert Collard, member of Éric Zemmour's party, reacted as soon as the teaser was released, talking about the film as a harbinger of a "civil war" to come.

Impact 
On 31 October 2022, migrants in the Austrian town Linz clashed with the police and the movie was mentioned as a reference on TikTok, days before the incident.

Awards

See also 
 List of French films of 2022

References

External links 
 
 

2022 action drama films
2022 multilingual films
2020s Arabic-language films
2020s French films
2020s French-language films
Films set in France
Films shot in Île-de-France
French action drama films
French-language Netflix original films
French multilingual films